The Arms of Egypt Movement ( Ḥarakat Sāwa'd Miṣr), commonly known as the Hasm Movement, is an Islamist militant group operating in Egypt.

The group despite having little uptime, has shown to have a very advanced organization and deployment which has led the security forces to link them with the Muslim Brotherhood.

History

Armed campaign

2016 
On 16 July, 2016 militants opened fire on a police vehicle in Tamiyyah, Faiyum, killing one officer and two were wounded in the attack.
On 5 August, the Hasm Movement claimed responsibility for an assassination attempt on the former Grand Mufti of Egypt Ali Gomaa.

On September 4 conscripst of the Central Security Forces were wounded after tried to defuse an improvised device in the city of Damietta. The Hasm Movement claimed this attack. Four days later, militants shot dead a police officer, in Sixth of October city, Giza.
Weeks later (29 September), the Hasm movement attempted to kill Zakaria Abdel Aziz, a senior assistant to Egypt's top prosecutor, as he was returning home from his office in eastern Cairo. The bomb failed to kill or hurt Aziz and his entourage, though one passerby was injured and taken to hospital.

Days later, militants attacked a police officer near his house in Mahmoudiyah, Beheira, killing the officer.
On 4 November 2016, the Hasm movement claimed responsibility for an assassination attempt on local judge Ahmed Aboul Fotouh in Nasr City. Judge Fotouh was one of three judges who sentenced former Islamist President Mohamed Morsi to twenty years in prison in 2015.

On 9 December 2016, the Hasm Movement claimed responsibility for an attack on a checkpoint on a main road near the Giza pyramid complex on the outskirts of Cairo, which killed six police officers.

2017 
Militants opened fire an Egyptian National Police (ENP) vehicle in Ibsheway, Faiyum, leaving one officer killed and other wounded. 

On March 27, 2017, assailants shot and killed a police officer in the village of Basarta, Damietta. Weeks later, security officers shot death the possible attacker responsible for the murder, in the operation, two officers were wounded. During the next monts the movement continued with his armed activity 

In May 1st, militants attacked a convoy of ENP agents killing three officers and wounded other five, this attack were in Nasr City, Cairo. On January 18,  an explosive device blasts and opened fire on a police vehicle in Maadi neighborhood, Cairo. The attack left   and the group stated that the attack was carried out in retaliation for the Egyptian government transferring ownership of two islands to Saudi Arabia.

2019 
The group was accused of being behind the 2019 Cairo explosion, which resulted in 20 deaths and 47 injured, but the group had denied the allegations.

On 11 April 2019, Egyptian government forces reportedly killed 6 members of the group in an armed confrontation, after discovering a plot to plant bombs in Giza, members of the group began shooting at police as they approached them for questioning resulting in a fire fight, after the fight several firearms and bomb making materials were discovered.

Arrests
Security forces arrests three people were detained for possible involvement in the attack ocurred in December, that kill six officers.

Designation as a terrorist group

On 22 December 2017, the United Kingdom banned HASM as a 'proscribed terrorist organisation'.
On 31 January 2018, the United States designated HASM as a 'Specially Designated Global Terrorist' entity. During may of 2017, US authorities warned their citizens about the risks of possible attacks against authorities, civilians and tourists

See also
 Al-Gama'a al-Islamiyya
 Terrorism in Egypt
 Muslim Brotherhood

References

External links
 Hassm Movement (Tracking Terrorism)
 Tracking Hasam Movement: Egypt's Ambitious New Militant Group
 Emergence of Hasm Movement indicates militants' attempt to revive Islamist insurgency in mainland Egypt
 Hasam Movement (timep.org)

2016 establishments in Egypt
Arab militant groups
Jihadist groups in Egypt
Organisations of the Egyptian Crisis (2011–2014)
Organizations established in 2014
Organisations designated as terrorist by the United Kingdom
Organizations designated as terrorist by the United States
Organizations designated as terrorist by Canada
Organizations designated as terrorist by Egypt